The rivière du Petit Portage (in English: Little Portage River) is a tributary of the west bank of the Chaudière River which flows northward to empty onto the south shore of the St. Lawrence River.

The Petit Portage river flows in the municipalities of Saint-Hilaire-de-Dorset and Saint-Gédéon-de-Beauce, in the Beauce-Sartigan Regional County Municipality (MRC), in the administrative region of Chaudière-Appalaches, in Quebec, in Canada.

Toponymy 

The toponym Rivière du Petit Portage was formalized on February 28, 1980, at the Commission de toponymie du Québec.

See also 

 List of rivers of Quebec

References 

Rivers of Chaudière-Appalaches
Beauce-Sartigan Regional County Municipality